"America" is a song by Prince and The Revolution. It was the final US single from the group's 1985 album, Around the World in a Day.

Background
"America" is a sardonic attack on the mid-1980s United States, referencing Communism, and worrying about nuclear war, a common theme in Prince's lyrics in the 1980s. 
The song begins with the sound of a record starting and stopping, as if being cued by a DJ. This leads into a guitar solo and a rising synthesized flute line. The main tune is standard rock and roll and fades out at 3:40. The 12-inch single extended version is notable for being over 21 minutes long and including various instrumental solos. The song fades just before the audio tape ran out, as Prince and the Revolution had jammed the song out until there was no more room on the tape. The video for this song, a 10-minute live version, was shot on October 27, 1985 during a "One Off" performance in Nice, France at Théâtre de Verdure and shown on MTV during an entire segment dedicated to the single. This would be the first televised interview that Prince gave since 1980 on American Bandstand. The segment included a live rendition of "America" and a one-on-one interview with fans surrounding Prince.

Cash Box said that the song is an "out and out jam" that "starts out with a deceptive and funny turntable-fooling intro and works into a sly comment on the American way using a traditional American melody."  Billboard called it "jagged socio-funk that tips its hat to Hendrix." 

The B-side of the track is "Girl", a light pop number that speaks of Prince's lust for a woman. Featuring a minimal drum loop and sparse synthesizer lines, Prince's lust is in such force that he declares, "All I have to do is think about you, and I can have an orgasm," as he invites her to both feel how sweaty his hands have gotten from their meeting, and let him be "the water in your bath". The full-length version from the 12-inch single features backmasking of Vanity reciting the lyrics with the word "boy" replacing the word "girl".

Charts

References

Prince (musician) songs
Songs written by Prince (musician)
1985 singles
Paisley Park Records singles
Warner Records singles
Song recordings produced by Prince (musician)
Songs about the United States
1985 songs
Political songs